Herbert Wright (16 September 1894 – 23 September 1982) was a British wrestler who competed in the 1920 Summer Olympics. In 1920 he won the bronze medal in the freestyle wrestling lightweight class after winning the bronze medal match against Auguste Thijs.

References

External links
 

1894 births
1982 deaths
Olympic wrestlers of Great Britain
Wrestlers at the 1920 Summer Olympics
British male sport wrestlers
Olympic bronze medallists for Great Britain
Olympic medalists in wrestling
Medalists at the 1920 Summer Olympics